Vratji Vrh is a small settlement above Vratja Vas in the Municipality of Apače in northeastern Slovenia.

References

External links 
Vratji Vrh on Geopedia

Populated places in the Municipality of Apače